Dangerous Things is a Seattle-based cybernetic microchip biohacking implant retailer formed in 2013 by Amal Graafstra, following a crowdfunding campaign.

Dangerous Things built the first personal publicly available implantable NFC compliant transponder in 2013.

References 

Companies based in Seattle
Bionics
Biotechnology companies of the United States
Companies established in 2013